Balksbury is the site of a former Bronze Age hill fort to the southwest of Andover, Hampshire.  Originally triangular in shape, most of it has been destroyed by the A303 Andover Bypass, and a large housing development.  Only the very southwest parts survive, visible, and up to 1m in height.  It was a large hillfort first occupied in the Late Bronze Age, and probably had rather a nice view over the confluence of Pillhill Brook and the River Anton, below and to the southeast. This was also the direction of the single gated entrance. It was used until and during the Roman period. It is listed on the scheduled ancient monuments list - but this status clearly hasn't afforded it much protection.

Location
The site is to the southeast of the town of Andover, within the county of Hampshire. The more prominent hillfort of Bury Hill lies to the southwest.

References



Buildings and structures in Hampshire
Hill forts in Hampshire
Archaeological sites in Hampshire
Bronze Age sites in Hampshire